Lambda Scorpii is a triple star system and the second-brightest object in the constellation of Scorpius. It is formally named Shaula; Lambda Scorpii is its Bayer designation, which is Latinised from λ Scorpii and abbreviated Lambda Sco or λ Sco. With an apparent visual magnitude of 1.62, it is one of the brightest stars in the night sky.

Nomenclature

λ Scorpii (Latinised to Lambda Scorpii) is the star system's Bayer designation.

It bore the traditional name Shaula, which comes from the Arabic الشولاء  al-šawlā´ meaning 'the raised [tail]', as it is found in the tail of Scorpius, the scorpion. In 2016, the International Astronomical Union organized a Working Group on Star Names (WGSN) to catalog and standardize proper names for stars. The WGSN's first bulletin of July 2016 included a table of the first two batches of names approved by the WGSN, which included Shaula for the star λ Scorpii Aa.

In Indian Astronomy it is called MulA Nakshathram. Mūla ("root") (Devanagari मूल/मूळ) (Tamil: மூலம்) is the 19th nakshatra or "lunar mansion" in Vedic astrology. The symbol of Mula is a bunch of roots tied together (reticulated roots) or an 'elephant goad' (ankusha).

Together with υ Scorpii (Lesath), Shaula is listed in the Babylonian compendium MUL.APIN as dSharur4 u dShargaz, meaning "Sharur and Shargaz".

In Coptic, they were called Minamref.

The indigenous Boorong people of northwestern Victoria (Australia) named it (together with Upsilon Scorpii) Karik Karik, "the Falcons".

Properties

Lambda Scorpii is located some 570 light-years away from the Sun.

Spectroscopic and interferometric observations have shown that it is actually a triple star system consisting of two B-type stars and a pre-main-sequence star. The primary star is a Beta Cephei variable star with rapid brightness changes of about a hundredth of a magnitude. The pre-main-sequence star has an orbital period of 6 days and the B companion has a period of 1053 days. The three stars lie in the same orbital plane, strongly suggesting that they were formed at the same time. The masses of the primary, pre-main-sequence star and the B companion are 14.5, 2.0 and 10.6 solar masses, respectively. The age of the system is estimated to be in the range 10–13 million years.

A 15th-magnitude star has a separation of 42 arcseconds, whereas a 12th-magnitude star is 95 arcseconds away. It is not known whether or not these components are physically associated with Lambda Scorpii. If they both were, the first would have a projected linear separation of approximately 7,500 astronomical units (AU) and the second approximately 17,000 AU (0.27 light-years) away.  Gaia Data Release 3 reports that the fainter of these two stars is a little larger and brighter than the sun and about 420 light years away, while the brighter star is a luminous background object.

In culture

Shaula appears on the flag of Brazil, symbolizing the state of Rio Grande do Norte.

USS Shaula (AK-118) was a U.S. Navy Crater-class cargo ship named after the star.

References

B-type subgiants
Beta Cephei variables
White dwarfs
5

Scorpius (constellation)
Scorpii, Lambda
6527
Durchmusterung objects
Scorpii, 35
158926
085927
Shaula